The 13th Canadian Folk Music Awards were presented in Ottawa, Ontario on November 19, 2017.

Nominees and recipients
Recipients are listed first and highlighted in boldface.

References

External links
 Canadian Folk Music Awards

13
Canadian Folk Music Awards
Canadian Folk Music Awards
Canadian Folk Music Awards
Canadian Folk Music Awards